Johannes "Jan" Marinus Plantaz (3 December 1930 – 10 February 1974) was a road and track cyclist from the Netherlands. He competed at the 1952 Summer Olympics in the road race (individual and team events) and 4 km team pursuit and finished in 22nd, 5th and 8th place, respectively. He won a bronze medal in the road race at the 1951 UCI Road World Championships.

He died from a heart attack during training.

See also
 List of Dutch Olympic cyclists

References

External links

 Dutch Olympic Committee

1930 births
1974 deaths
Dutch track cyclists
Dutch male cyclists
Cyclists at the 1952 Summer Olympics
Olympic cyclists of the Netherlands
People from Geldrop
UCI Road World Championships cyclists for the Netherlands
Cyclists from North Brabant
20th-century Dutch people